Camille Lopez (born 3 April 1989) is a French rugby union player. He plays as a fly-half for Bayonne.

Club career

In 2009 it was announced that Lopez would leave SA Mauléon and join Bordeaux, he became an integral part of their team. It has been reported that Lopez has been wanted by ASM Clermont Auvergne, but in 2013 he moved from Bordeaux to Perpignan after scoring over 500 points.

Later, in 2014 Lopez made the move to ASM Clermont Auvergne.

International career

On 14 May 2013, Lopez was announced in the 2013 French tour of New Zealand. He was selected ahead of out of form François Trinh-Duc. He was announced to be starting the first test against New Zealand and played well and scored his first international points with a penalty, after taking over the kicking duties from Maxime Machenaud.

References

External links
France profile at FFR
ItsRugby profile
ERC profile

Living people
1989 births
People from Oloron-Sainte-Marie
French people of Spanish descent
French rugby union players
USA Perpignan players
Union Bordeaux Bègles players
ASM Clermont Auvergne players
Aviron Bayonnais players
Sportspeople from Pyrénées-Atlantiques
France international rugby union players
Rugby union fly-halves